The first lady of Kenya is the title held by the wife of the president of Kenya. The country's present first lady is Rachel Ruto, wife of president William Ruto, who took office on 13 September 2022.

First ladies of Kenya

Daniel arap Moi and his wife Lena Moi separated in 1974. However, they remained married until her death on 22 July 2004. Ngina reportedly retained her first lady status even after the death of her husband in 1978. Official papers and statements released by the Kenyan government identified Lena Moi as the country's "second first lady."

In April 2016, Kenya lost its 3rd first lady Lucy Kibaki who died while undergoing treatment in London, United Kingdom. She was the wife to the 3rd president of Kenya Mwai Kibaki.

See also 
President of Kenya

References

External links
Office of the First Lady of Kenya 
@FirstLadyKenya Twitter account (verified)

Politics of Kenya
Lists of Kenyan women
Kenya
Lists of political office-holders in Kenya